Phantom Lake YMCA Camp is a YMCA camp located in Mukwonago, Wisconsin, United States. Founded in 1896, it is one of the oldest YMCA camps in North America. Phantom Lake is fully accredited by the American Camping Association.

Administration
Chief executive officer: Jeff Spang
Chief Operations Officer: Tracy Stockwell
Camp Director: India Koller
 Operations Director: Carolyn Russell
 Assistant Camp Director: Summer Williams

Summer camping programs
Resident camp: A one-week overnight camping experience for youth ages 7–17. There are coed, girls', boys' and teen weeks. During some weeks, half-week sessions are available for children ages 7–8.
Day camp: A one-week day camping experience for youth ages 3–13.

Year-round activities
Winter camp: A four-day winter camp.
Family camp: Family camps over Labor Day Weekend and the weekend prior to Labor Day Weekend.
Groups and retreats: The site is used for church groups, conferences, families, retreats, youth groups, and meetings.

Activities
Boating: Sailing, canoeing, paddle boarding, sea kayaking, and funyaking (inflatable kayaking)
Swimming
Arts and crafts
Archery
Riflery
Zip line
Land sports: Basketball, floor hockey and soccer
Dance
Music
Theater

Notes

Buildings and structures in Waukesha County, Wisconsin
YMCA Summer Camps
Summer camps in Wisconsin